Boy Meets Girl is a 2014 American romantic comedy-drama film directed by Eric Schaeffer and starring Michelle Hendley as a trans woman living in a small town in Kentucky, looking for love.

Plot
21-year-old Ricky is a transgender woman living in a small town in Kentucky with big dreams to move to New York and attend a school of fashion design. Ricky is working as a barista and spends most of her time hanging out with her only friend Robby, who has been by her side for the past 15 years. One day while Ricky is at work, Francesca, a woman from town, walks in and a friendship unexpectedly blossoms that then turns into an affair.

Cast
 Michael Welch as Robby Riley
 Robert Racco as 9-year-old Robby Riley
 Michelle Hendley as Ricky Jones
 Rachel Racco as 9-year-old Ricky Jones
 Alexandra Turshen as Francesca Duval
 Michael Galante as David
 Randall Newsome as Hank Jones
 Joseph Ricci as Sam Jones
 Elizabeth Ward Land as Helen Duval
 Christopher McHale as Dayton Duval

Critical reception
Gary Goldstein of the Los Angeles Times gave the film a favorable review, calling it a "lovely story, one which brims with credible, enormously heartfelt emotion". The Washington Post gave it two stars out of four, stating that "Boy Meets Girl comes across not just as an emotional story, but also an earnestly instructive one."

References

External links
 
 
 

2014 films
2014 independent films
2014 LGBT-related films
2014 romantic comedy-drama films
2010s coming-of-age comedy-drama films
2010s English-language films
American coming-of-age comedy-drama films
American independent films
American LGBT-related films
American romantic comedy-drama films
Coming-of-age romance films
Female bisexuality in film
Films about couples
Films about trans women
Films directed by Eric Schaeffer
Films set in Kentucky
Films shot in Vermont
LGBT-related coming-of-age films
LGBT-related romantic comedy-drama films
2010s American films